Eriauchenus is a genus of East African assassin spiders first described by O. Pickard-Cambridge in 1881. The genus name has been incorrectly spelt "Eriauchenius".

Species
, it contained twenty species, all found on Madagascar:
Eriauchenus andriamanelo Wood & Scharff, 2018 – Madagascar
Eriauchenus andrianampoinimerina Wood & Scharff, 2018 – Madagascar
Eriauchenus bourgini (Millot, 1948) – Madagascar
Eriauchenus fisheri (Lotz, 2003) – Madagascar
Eriauchenus goodmani Wood & Scharff, 2018 – Madagascar
Eriauchenus harveyi Wood & Scharff, 2018 – Madagascar
Eriauchenus lukemacaulayi Wood & Scharff, 2018 – Madagascar
Eriauchenus mahariraensis (Lotz, 2003) – Madagascar
Eriauchenus milajaneae Wood & Scharff, 2018 – Madagascar
Eriauchenus milloti Wood & Scharff, 2018 – Madagascar
Eriauchenus pauliani (Legendre, 1970) – Madagascar
Eriauchenus rafohy Wood & Scharff, 2018 – Madagascar
Eriauchenus ranavalona Wood & Scharff, 2018 – Madagascar
Eriauchenus rangita Wood & Scharff, 2018 – Madagascar
Eriauchenus ratsirarsoni (Lotz, 2003) – Madagascar
Eriauchenus rixi Wood & Scharff, 2018 – Madagascar
Eriauchenus sama Wood & Scharff, 2018 – Madagascar
Eriauchenus workmani O. Pickard-Cambridge, 1881 (type) – Madagascar
Eriauchenus wunderlichi Wood & Scharff, 2018 – Madagascar
Eriauchenus zirafy Wood & Scharff, 2018 – Madagascar

References

Araneomorphae genera
Archaeidae
Endemic fauna of Madagascar
Spiders of Madagascar
Spiders of South Africa